R City Mall is a shopping mall located in Ghatkopar West, Mumbai. The mall spreads across 1.2 million square feet with the capacity to house over 350 stores. The mall has over 194 shopping stores, over 66 food outlets, 10 entertainment areas, 3 ATM facilities, 13 service areas, and a Movie Theatre (INOX Leisure Limited). The mall was opened in two phases, now known as the southern and northern end  and  the total size of the first phase of the development is 7.5 lakh square feet. It is a project developed by The Runwal Group.

See also
List of shopping malls in India
 Ghatkopar

References

External links

 Mall Website

Shopping malls established in 2009
Shopping malls in Mumbai
2009 establishments in Maharashtra